Bobby Clark (died May 22, 2014) was the American tenor vocalist with the Cathedral Quartet from 1963 through 1967.

He was also a member of the Dixie Echoes, Deep South Quartet, The Weatherfords, The Oak Ridge Quartet, The Rangers, and the Men of Music.  He appeared with the Rex Humbard National Television Ministry for eight years from the Cathedral of Tomorrow Church in Akron, Ohio.  Bobby Clark recorded many long-play albums and CDs of gospel music.  Outside of gospel, he had a contract with the Swope Park Musical Lyric Theatre in Kansas City, Missouri.  Clark studied on a full-pay scholarship at the Cleveland Institute of Music in Cleveland, Ohio.  His teacher was the renown Metropolitan operatic soprano, Elenore Steber.   Clark sang with the Cleveland Symphony Orchestra in operatic excerpts under the conductorship of George Szell. He appeared in numerous roles with the Orlando Opera Company for five years while pastoring an Independent Baptist Church in Winter Springs, Florida.  Bobby Clark was active in the U.S. for selective singing concerts.

Clark's voice has contributed to a number of country music recordings. Country artists with which Clark has worked include Marty Robbins, Jimmy Dean, and Hank Snow.

Bobby Clark died on May 22, 2014.

Men Of Music Members

References

External links
Bobby Clark Official Website
Bobby Clark | SouthernGospelBlog.com

Year of birth missing
2014 deaths
American male singers
American opera singers
American tenors
American performers of Christian music
Southern gospel performers
Cleveland Institute of Music alumni